The 1994–95 NBA season was the Bucks' 27th season in the National Basketball Association. The Bucks held the right to select first overall in the 1994 NBA draft, the third time in franchise history, after 1969 and 1977–, and selected Glenn Robinson out of Purdue University. During the off-season, the team signed free agents Marty Conlon, Johnny Newman, and Alton Lister, and acquired Ed Pinckney from the Boston Celtics. However, after a 5–3 start to the season, the Bucks went on a nine-game losing streak, and played below .500 for the remainder of the season, holding a 19–29 record at the All-Star break. Eric Murdock played half of the season off the bench, being replaced with Lee Mayberry as the team's starting point guard. The Bucks finished sixth in the Central Division with a 34–48 record, missing the playoffs finishing just one game behind the 8th-seeded Boston Celtics.

Robinson had a stellar rookie season as he averaged 21.9 points, 6.4 rebounds and 1.4 steals per game, made the NBA All-Rookie First Team, and finished in third place in Rookie of the Year voting. In addition, second-year star Vin Baker continued to improve averaging 17.7 points, 10.3 rebounds and 1.4 blocks per game, and was selected for the 1995 NBA All-Star Game, while Todd Day provided the team with 16.0 points per game, and led them with 163 three-point field goals. Murdock contributed 13.0 points, 6.4 assists and 1.5 steals per game, while off the bench, Conlon averaged 9.9 points and 5.2 rebounds per game, Newman contributed 7.7 points per game, and Mayberry provided with 5.8 points and 3.4 assists per game.

Following the season, Pinckney left in the 1995 NBA Expansion Draft, and Jon Barry signed as a free agent with the Golden State Warriors.

Draft picks

Roster

Roster Notes
 Power forward Roy Hinson missed the entire season due to a knee injury, and never played for the Bucks.

Regular season

Season standings

z - clinched division title
y - clinched division title
x - clinched playoff spot

Record vs. opponents

Game log

|- align="center" bgcolor="#ccffcc"
| 1
| November 4, 1994
| @ Philadelphia
| W 91–86
| Conlon, Newman (20)
|
|
| CoreStates Spectrum16,114
| 1–0
|- align="center" bgcolor="#ccffcc"
| 2
| November 5, 1994
| L.A. Lakers
| W 97–96
| Baker (22)
|
|
| Bradley Center18,633
| 2–0
|- align="center" bgcolor="#ffcccc"
| 3
| November 10, 1994
| @ Cleveland
| L 88–108
| Newman (30)
|
|
| Gund Arena19,203
| 2–1
|- align="center" bgcolor="#ffcccc"
| 4
| November 11, 1994
| Charlotte
| L 115–123
|
|
|
| Bradley Center16,236
| 2–2
|- align="center" bgcolor="#ccffcc"
| 5
| November 15, 1994
| Indiana
| W 82–81
|
|
|
| Bradley Center15,264
| 3–2
|- align="center" bgcolor="#ccffcc"
| 6
| November 19, 1994
| @ Atlanta
| W 97–93
|
|
|
| The Omni11,862
| 4–2
|- align="center" bgcolor="#ffcccc"
| 7
| November 19, 1994
| Seattle
| L 96–120
|
|
|
| Bradley Center18,633
| 4–3
|- align="center" bgcolor="#ccffcc"
| 8
| November 22, 1994
| @ Boston
| W 116–94
|
|
|
| Hartford Civic Center12,829
| 5–3
|- align="center" bgcolor="#ffcccc"
| 9
| November 23, 1994
| @ Detroit
| L 108–113
|
|
|
| The Palace of Auburn Hills21,454
| 5–4
|- align="center" bgcolor="#ffcccc"
| 10
| November 25, 1994
| @ Indiana
| L 106–111
|
|
|
| Market Square Arena16,694
| 5–5
|- align="center" bgcolor="#ffcccc"
| 11
| November 26, 1994
| Orlando
| L 105–113
|
|
|
| Bradley Center18,633
| 5–6
|- align="center" bgcolor="#ffcccc"
| 12
| November 29, 1994
| Phoenix
| L 106–123
|
|
|
| Bradley Center14,564
| 5–7

|- align="center" bgcolor="#ffcccc"
| 13
| December 1, 1994
| Cleveland
| L 87–93
|
|
|
| Bradley Center13,648
| 5–8
|- align="center" bgcolor="#ffcccc"
| 14
| December 3, 1994
| @ Seattle
| L 108–111
|
|
|
| Tacoma Dome14,661
| 5–9
|- align="center" bgcolor="#ffcccc"
| 15
| December 4, 1994
| @ Portland
| L 103–106
|
|
|
| Memorial Coliseum12,888
| 5–10
|- align="center" bgcolor="#ffcccc"
| 16
| December 6, 1994
| @ Sacramento
| L 95–108
|
|
|
| ARCO Arena17,317
| 5–11
|- align="center" bgcolor="#ffcccc"
| 17
| December 7, 1994
| @ L. A. Clippers
| L 94–96
|
|
|
| Los Angeles Memorial Sports Arena6,433
| 5–12
|- align="center" bgcolor="#ccffcc"
| 18
| December 10, 1994
| Chicago
| W 106–103
|
|
|
| Bradley Center18,633
| 6–12
|- align="center" bgcolor="#ffcccc"
| 19| December 13, 1994
| @ Charlotte
| L 101–107
|
|
|
| Charlotte Coliseum23,698
| 6–13
|- align="center" bgcolor="#ccffcc"
| 20
| December 14, 1994
| Philadelphia
| W 99–96
| Robinson (32)
| Lister (13)
| Mayberry (6)
| Bradley Center13,785
| 7–13
|- align="center" bgcolor="#ffcccc"
| 21
| December 18, 1994
| Utah
| L 98–101
|
|
|
| Bradley Center16,624
| 7–14
|- align="center" bgcolor="#ffcccc"
| 22
| December 20, 1994
| @ Atlanta
| L 97–115
|
|
|
| The Omni8,818
| 7–15
|- align="center" bgcolor="#ffcccc"
| 23
| December 21, 1994
| @ Miami
| L 112–122
|
|
|
| Miami Arena14,402
| 7–16
|- align="center" bgcolor="#ffcccc"
| 24
| December 23, 1994
| @ Orlando
| L 91–123
|
|
|
| Orlando Arena16,010
| 7–17
|- align="center" bgcolor="#ccffcc"
| 25
| December 26, 1994
| New Jersey
| W 101–97
|
|
|
| Bradley Center16,475
| 8–17
|- align="center" bgcolor="#ccffcc"
| 26
| December 27, 1994
| @ Detroit
| W 98–88
|
|
|
| The Palace of Auburn Hills18,209
| 9–17
|- align="center" bgcolor="#ffcccc"
| 27
| December 30, 1994
| Charlotte
| L 94–101
|
|
|
| Bradley Center18,026
| 9–18

|- align="center" bgcolor="#ffcccc"
| 28
| January 3, 1995
| @ Utah
| L 91–123
|
|
|
| Delta Center18,701
| 9–19
|- align="center" bgcolor="#ccffcc"
| 29
| January 5, 1995
| @ Golden State
| W 111–103
|
|
|
| Oakland-Alameda County Coliseum Arena15,025
| 10–19
|- align="center" bgcolor="#ffcccc"
| 30
| January 6, 1995
| @ L.A. Lakers
| L 98–111
|
|
|
| The Forum13,227
| 10–20
|- align="center" bgcolor="#ffcccc"
| 31
| January 8, 1995
| @ Denver
| L 96–102
|
|
|
| McNichols Sports Arena17,171
| 10–21
|- align="center" bgcolor="#ffcccc"
| 32
| January 9, 1995
| @ Phoenix
| L 102–119
|
|
|
| American West Arena19,023
| 10–22
|- align="center" bgcolor="#ccffcc"
| 33
| January 11, 1995
| Sacramento
| W 97–88
|
|
|
| Bradley Center13,279
| 11–22
|- align="center" bgcolor="#ffcccc"
| 34
| January 13, 1995
| New York
| L 88–91
|
|
|
| Bradley Center17,909
| 11–23
|- align="center" bgcolor="#ccffcc"
| 35
| January 14, 1995
| @ Indiana
| W 97–95
|
|
|
| Market Square Arena16,716
| 12–23
|- align="center" bgcolor="#ccffcc"
| 36
| January 18, 1995
| @ Chicago
| W 97–93
|
|
|
| United Center22,191
| 13–23
|- align="center" bgcolor="#ccffcc"
| 37
| January 19, 1995
| Washington
| W 120–115
|
|
|
| Bradley Center13,311
| 14–23
|- align="center" bgcolor="#ccffcc"
| 38
| January 21, 1995
| Detroit
| W 120–100
|
|
|
| Bradley Center18,633
| 15–23
|- align="center" bgcolor="#ffcccc"
| 39
| January 24, 19957:30p.m. CST
| Houston
| L 99–115
| Conlon (21)
| Baker (9)
| Murdock (14)
| Bradley Center14,556
| 15–24
|- align="center" bgcolor="#ccffcc"
| 40
| January 25, 1995
| @ Philadelphia
| W 98–97
|
|
|
| CoreStates Spectrum8,384
| 16–24
|- align="center" bgcolor="#ffcccc"
| 41
| January 27, 1995
| Miami
| L 87–96
|
|
|
| Bradley Center18,171
| 16–25
|- align="center" bgcolor="#ffcccc"
| 42
| January 28, 1995
| @ Orlando
| L 103–107
|
|
|
| Orlando Arena16,010
| 16–26
|- align="center" bgcolor="#ccffcc"
| 43
| January 31, 1995
| Dallas
| W 107–105
|
|
|
| Bradley Center15,398
| 17–26

|- align="center"
|colspan="9" bgcolor="#bbcaff"|All-Star Break
|- style="background:#cfc;"
|- bgcolor="#bbffbb"

|- align="center" bgcolor="#ccffcc"
| 72
| April 1, 19957:30p.m. CST
| @ Houston
| W 93–87
| Robinson (29)
| Newman (11)
| Baker (5)
| The Summit16,611
| 28–44

Player statistics

Awards and records
 Glenn Robinson, NBA All-Rookie Team First Team

Transactions

Trades

Free agents

Player Transactions Citation:

See also
 1994-95 NBA season

References

Milwaukee Bucks seasons
Milwaukee Bucks
Milwaukee Bucks
Milwaukee